Susie Allanson (born March 17, 1952) is an American country music singer and actress. Susie was raised in Burbank and lived in Las Vegas from 1963-71. Before beginning her singing career in the mid-1970s, she toured as part of Jesus Christ Superstar and appeared in the film of the same name. As a singer, she released five studio albums and charted several singles on the Billboard and Cashbox country charts, including the No. 2 hit "We Belong Together". She also had top ten chart success with a cover of Buddy Holly's "Maybe Baby" and "Words" by the Bee Gees. Her early albums were produced by Ray Ruff, her then husband. The couple subsequently divorced. She later married musician Steve Williams. She now lives in California with her two children, Daniel and Amanda, and her husband.

Discography

Albums

Singles

References

1952 births
Living people
Musicians from Minneapolis
American women country singers
American country singer-songwriters
Country musicians from Minnesota
People from the Las Vegas Valley
Songwriters from Minnesota
Singers from Minnesota
Warner Records artists
Curb Records artists